Peter Kropotkin (1842–1921) was a Russian prince and anarchist.

Kropotkin may also refer to:

 Biographies of the Russian anarchist
 Peter Kropotkin: From Prince to Rebel, a reprint of the 1950 biography by George Woodcock and Ivan Avakumović.
 Kropotkin (biography), a 1976 biography by Martin A. Miller
Mount Kropotkin, a peak in Antarctica
Golets Kropotkin, a peak in Siberia
Kropotkin Range, Patom Highlands, Siberia
Kropotkin Range (Eastern Sayan), Siberia
Kropotkin (urban locality), name of several urban localities in Russia
The Kropotkins, American musical group founded by Dave Soldier in 1994

People with the surname
Pyotr Nikolayevich Kropotkin (1910–1996), Soviet/Russian geologist, tectonician, and geophysicist, grand nephew of Peter Kropotkin